The House of Mocenigo  was a Venetian noble family of Lombard Dalmatian origin.  Many of its members were doges, statesmen, and soldiers.

Notable members 
 Tommaso Mocenigo (1343-1423), doge 1414-1423
 Pietro Mocenigo, doge from 1474 to 1476
 Giovanni Mocenigo, doge from 1478 to 1485
 Giovanni Zuane Mocenigo, (lived in 16th century) accused Giordano Bruno of blasphemy and heresy.
 Luigi Mocenigo (Alvise I Mocenigo), doge from 1570 to 1577
 Tommaso Alvise Mocenigo (1583-1654), Capitano Generale da Mar, (admiral) of the Venetian fleet 1648-1651, and again 1653-1654, during the Cretan War (1645–1669) (Fifth Turkish–Venetian War), commanding during two crucial engagements. He died in Venice soon after his last naval battle, and was memorialised in the church of San Lazzaro dei Mendicanti with a monument by sculptor Giuseppe Sardi (1624–1699)
 Andrea Mocenigo (lived 15th-16th centuries), a senator of the republic and a historian
 Lazzaro Mocenigo (1624-1657), admiral
 Luigi Mocenigo (Alvise II Mocenigo), doge from 1700 to 1709
 Sebastiano Mocenigo, doge from 1722 to 1732. 
 Alvise Giovanni Mocenigo, doge from 1763 to 1778
 Giovanni Mocenigo, ambassador of pope Clement XII in 18th Century

References

"Mocenigo (family)." Encyclopædia Britannica Eleventh Edition.